Marzi is a Pakistani drama serial first aired on Geo Entertainment on 14 July 2016. It was produced by Babar Javed and written by Ali Moeen. Rabab Hashim and Junaid Khan played the leading roles in the serial.

Synopsis 
Marzi revolves around a young girl, Manaal (Rabab Hashim) as she struggles with her unrequited love for Zain (Junaid Khan). Belonging to a middle class family, Manaal and her mother are dependent on her sister Afeera (Jana Malik) who is married to Irfan (Babar Ali), an influential businessman. Irfan’s dominating and demeaning behaviour, makes him the sole patriarch of his family. While on the other hand, Zain is a radio jockey and a singer in Irfan’s FM company. After a couple of meetings, Manaal falls in love with Zain while Zain remains sceptical about his feelings. Upon knowing about Manaal’s family background, Zain steps back as he fears getting involved with Irfan’s family. Irfan's vicious planning against Zain and Manaal makes him put Zain under fake kidnapping charges of Manaal. Manaal being reckless and rebellious at heart asks Zain to fight for themselves.

Will Zain ever be able to stand for his love or will he succumb to Irfan’s will?

Cast 
Rabab Hashim as Manaal
Jana Malik as Afeera
Babar Ali as Irfan
Junaid Khan as Zain
Seemi Raheel
Najia Baig
Khalid Saleem Butt
Munazzah Arif as Manaal's aunt
Abdullah Ejaz
Ali Sikandar

Soundtrack 
The original soundtrack of Marzi is sung by Junaid Khan, the lead actor of this drama serial. The song is available on Patari.

References

External links

2016 Pakistani television series debuts
A&B Entertainment